A. nigrum may refer to:
 Acer nigrum, the black maple, a tree species
 Allium nigrum, the black garlic, broadleaf garlic, an ornamental plant species

See also
 List of Latin and Greek words commonly used in systematic names#N